The Bank of South Sudan is the central bank of the Republic of South Sudan. Established in July 2011, by an Act of Parliament (The Bank of South Sudan Act, 2011), it replaced the now defunct Bank of Southern Sudan, a former branch of the Bank of Sudan, which had served as the central bank of South Sudan, during the period between February 2005 until July 2011. The bank is fully owned by the Government of South Sudan.

Location

The bank maintains its headquarters in the city of Juba, the capital of South Sudan, with branches in the towns of Wau, Yei and Malakal.

Organization and Governance

The Bank of South Sudan is the central bank of the Republic of South Sudan. It is headed by the Governor of the Bank of South Sudan. The Bank is the only institution that is constitutionally mandated to issue the South Sudanese pound.

Duties

The main functions of the Bank of South Sudan are:

 To function as the central bank of South Sudan.
 To establish and supervise conventional banking services in South Sudan including licenses to financial institutions according to rules and regulations issued by the board of directors.
 The management of the bank is under the Governor of the Bank of South Sudan, who will manage the conventional banking system in South Sudan according to prevailing rules, regulation and policies.
 To act as the bank to the Government of South Sudan, as an adviser and agent thereof in monetary and financial affairs.
 In the discharge of the duties, responsibilities and mandates thereby required and imposed upon it, to exercise the power and supervisory authority so conferred, in a manner consistent with the ordinances and regulations stipulated in the laws that govern the bank.
 The Bank of South Sudan shall be in charge of supervising and regulating commercial banks in South Sudan.

Management

Principal officers

 Moses Makur Deng  - Governor
Johnny Ohisa Damian Deputy Governor for banking and currency
 Daniel Kech Puoc - Deputy Governor for Administration & Finance
Yeni Samuel Costa - Director General for Currency & Banking
 Marial Bawuor Mabeny - Director General for Supervision and Research
Samuel Yanga Mekaya - Director General for Administration and Fianance
Yeni Samuel Costa

Governors of the Bank of South Sudan

The Governors were appointed by the President of South Sudan.

See also

 Ministry of Finance and Economic Planning (South Sudan)
 List of banks in South Sudan
 Economy of South Sudan
 List of central banks of Africa
 List of central banks
 Banking in South Sudan
 Commonwealth banknote-issuing institutions

References

Banks of South Sudan
Government of South Sudan
South Sudan
Banks established in 2011
2011 establishments in South Sudan
Companies based in Juba